David D. Balam  is a Canadian astronomer and a research associate with University of Victoria's Department of Physics and Astronomy, in Victoria, British Columbia. Specializing in the search for Near-Earth objects, Balam is one of the world's most prolific contributors to this research; only two astronomers have made more such discoveries than Balam. He is credited with the discovery or co-discovery of more than 600 asteroids, over a thousand extra-galactic supernovae, and novae in the galaxy M31. Balam is also co-credited for the 1997 discovery of Comet Zhu-Balam.

Among celestial bodies discovered by Balam are the asteroid 150145 Uvic, which he named for the University of Victoria, and 197856 Tafelmusik, named for the Baroque orchestra in Toronto. Currently, Balam conducts an optical transient survey (OTS) using the 1.82-m Plaskett Telescope of the National Research Council of Canada.

The asteroid 3749 Balam is named in his honour, recognizing the fact that he developed most of the software for the university's astrometric program on minor planets and comets.

List of discovered minor planets

References 

 

Discoverers of asteroids

Living people
Academic staff of the University of Victoria
Year of birth missing (living people)
Scientists from British Columbia
20th-century Canadian astronomers
21st-century Canadian astronomers